Nishaan is a 1983 Indian Hindi-language action film, produced by B.S. Shaad under the BRAR Productions banner and directed by Surendra Mohan. It stars  Jeetendra, Rajesh Khanna, Rekha, Poonam Dhillon in lead roles and has music composed by Rajesh Roshan.

Plot
Diwan (Jeevan) and Bhagail Singh (Amrish Puri) kill Kumar Ratan Singh (Vijay Arora) for his properties. In the confusion that follows that his wife Lajwanti (Gita Siddharth) and her sons, Shankar and Ravi are separated. Shankar drifts around in search of his mother and Ravi. Now after years, Shankar (Rajesh Khanna) is a truck driver and loves a village belle Gulabo (Poonam Dhillon), on the other side, Ravi (Jeetendra) works for Diwan and loves his daughter Rita (Rekha). Shankar and Ravi are friends. Diwan and Bhagail Singh drive a wedge between them and have Shankar sent to jail on a false charge of theft. Shankar tries to take revenge on Ravi, but he discovers that he is his brother. They turn over Diwan and Bhagail to the police. Shankar and Ravi meet their mother and there is a happy family reunion.

Cast
 Jeetendra as Ravi Singh
 Rajesh Khanna as Shankar Singh
 Rekha as Rita
 Poonam Dhillon as Gulabo
 Jeevan as Diwan
 Amrish Puri as Bhagail Singh
 Roopesh Kumar as Veeru
 Satyendra Kapoor
 Vijay Arora as Kumar Ratan Singh
 Gita Siddharth as Lajwanti
 Chandrashekhar Dubey as Lala
 Jankidas as Pandit
 Rajan Haksar as Mukhiya

Soundtrack

External links 
 

1983 films
1980s action drama films
Indian action drama films
Films scored by Rajesh Roshan
1980s Hindi-language films
Films directed by Surendra Mohan